Super Robot Taisen OG Saga: Endless Frontier Exceed is a crossover role-playing video game co-developed by Monolith Soft and Banpresto and published by Namco Bandai Games for the Nintendo DS (DS) in 2010. Forming part of the Super Robot Wars  series, Endless Frontier Exceed is a sequel to the  2008 DS game Super Robot Taisen OG Saga: Endless Frontier, carrying over its gameplay elements.

Premise
Super Robot Taisen OG Saga: Endless Frontier Exceed is a crossover role-playing video game. Players take control of a party of characters drawn from multiple anime and video game franchises. Gameplay is divided between field navigation, dialogue sections between characters, and turn-based battles where players can expend action points to perform different moves.

Development
Endless Frontier Exceed was co-developed by Monolith Soft, a Japanese company known for its work on the Xenosaga series, and Super Robot Wars creators Banpresto. The team from Monolith Soft included veterans from the PlayStation 2 crossover title Namco × Capcom. The scenario was written by director Soichiro Morizumi, using his recurring story theme of "Love". The anime opening was produced by Xebec. The music was handled by a team of composers from Salamander, a music production company which had worked on earlier Super Robot Wars. The theme song "UNCHAIN∞WORLD" was composed by Noriyasu Agematsu of Element Garden, and performed by Nana Mizuki. The game was released on February 25, 2010.

Reception
During its debut week, Endless Frontier Exceed reached third place in gaming charts, with sales of 65,000 units. In subsequent weeks it remained in the top twenty, with total sales by March coming to over 87,000 units.

Japanese gaming magazine Famitsu gave the game a score of 32 out of 40.

Notes

References

External links
Official site

2010 video games
Banpresto games
Bandai Namco games
Monolith Soft games
Nintendo DS games
Nintendo DS-only games
Role-playing video games
Super Robot Wars
Video games developed in Japan
Xebec (studio)